John Hopkin Nuckolls (born 17 November 1930) is an American physicist who worked his entire career at the Lawrence Livermore National Laboratory. He is best known for the development of inertial confinement fusion, which is a major branch of fusion power research to this day. He was also the lab's director from 1988 until 1994, when he resigned to become an Associate Director at Large. He was awarded the Ernest Orlando Lawrence Award in 1969, the James Clerk Maxwell Prize for Plasma Physics in 1981 and the Edward Teller Award in 1991.

Career
Nuckolls was born 17 November 1930 in Chicago, Il. He received his BSc from Wheaton College in 1953, and his MSc from Columbia University in 1955. Nuckolls joined what was then the Lawrence Radiation Laboratory immediately after graduation in 1955, only three years after the lab's formation. He initially worked in "A Division", responsible for nuclear weapon design. He joined the Project Plowshare efforts in 1957 after attending a meeting on the topic arranged by Edward Teller.

There are two parts to a typical hydrogen bomb, a plutonium-based atomic bomb known as the primary, and a cylindrical arrangement of fusion fuels known as the secondary. The primary releases significant amounts of x-rays, which are trapped within the bomb casing and heat and compress the secondary until it undergoes fusion. As a fission device, the primary releases a significant amount of radioactive material, whereas the secondary releases primarily neutrons which are stopped by the ground. Nuckolls began work on weapon designs that minimized the amount of fission and maximized the fusion, in order to reduce the radioactive byproducts of peaceful explosions. It was this work that won him the Lawrence Award.

Among Plowshare's many concepts was a 1957 predecessor to Project PACER, which intended to produce electrical power from the explosions of nuclear weapons in caverns. Nuckolls was struck by the size of the caverns needed to contain the explosions and the accumulation of fissile material from exploded primaries, and began to wonder if these problems could be solved by scaling down the cavity and using a remote ignition. The secondary relies on neutrons to carry out a chain reaction that converts lithium deuteride (LiD) into deuterium and tritium which then undergoes fusion. The fusion releases neutrons which continue the reaction, but to get the reaction going some external source is needed. However, if the LiD fuel is replaced by "raw" deuterium and tritium, the initial source of neutrons is not needed. In that case, there is no lower limit to the size of the secondary.

The limiting factor in that case is the size of the primary, which cannot be made much smaller than critical mass. However, Nuckolls noticed that as the secondary became very small, on the order of milligrams, the energy needed to start the reaction began to fall into the kilojoule range. At that point a primary would not be needed, there were a variety of devices that could produce that amount of energy. The demonstration of the first laser in 1960 provided the right mix of features to be a potential driver for these reactions. As these improved, in the late 1960s Nuckolls led an effort to characterize this inertial approach to fusion, much of which was revealed in a 1972 article in Nature. It was this work that won him the James Clerk Maxwell Award in 1981.

Livermore started its laser fusion program in 1962-63 and began to greatly expand its inertial fusion program in the early 1970s as the first high-power lasers became available. In 1975, Nuckolls was promoted to become the Associate Leader of the Laser Fusion Program, as well as the Divisional Leader of the "X-group" that designed the fuel targets. In 1983 he was promoted to become the Associate Director of the entire Physics branch. In 1988 he was promoted to become the Director of the entire Livermore lab.

In 1991, Nuckolls was awarded the Edward Teller Award for his contributions to inertial confinement fusion.

Controversial Directorship
Nuckolls' tenure as Director was controversial. When he was being promoted, a number of colleagues warned that he was not a decision maker.

Early in his tenure, Nuckolls joined Lowell Wood and Edward Teller in a visit to the White House to brief President George Bush Sr. on Wood's Brilliant Pebbles concept for the Strategic Defense Initiative. This was a break with tradition, where Directors generally remained aloof from such actives, and a number of commenters stated this made the lab "like any other defense contractor". This led to a "devastating decline in morale among Livermore scientists."

Other issues plagued the lab as it transitioned from its cold war weapon-making role to a support system for a much wider array of potentially civilian topics; Energy Secretary Hazel O'Leary had proposed to move all weapons research to Los Alamos National Laboratory, a move that Nuckolls "fiercely opposed." This led to an increasingly confrontational relationship in Washington, culminating in his public statement that the Clinton administration was failing in its constitutional duty to "provide for the common defense." Adding to the lab's woes, in November 1993 the Government Accountability Office released a report that found serious problems with the lab's budget and accounting.

In late 1993 the University of California, who managed the lab, called for a review of Nuckolls' directorship. The review was "universally negative" and there were private calls for his resignation. At first he refused, claiming there was support for his position within the Department of Energy and the Pentagon, and then calling into question the objectivity of the review due to its chair being Richard Truly, who had been dismissed after being criticized by Teller. The University called a meeting for 6 April to discuss the issues, but on 4 April Nuckolls offered his resignation.

References

Citations

Bibliography
 
 
 
 
 

Living people
21st-century American physicists
Lawrence Livermore National Laboratory staff
1930 births